Adrastea, also known as , is the second by distance, and the smallest of the four inner moons of Jupiter. It was discovered in photographs taken by Voyager 2 in 1979, making it the first natural satellite to be discovered from images taken by an interplanetary spacecraft, rather than through a telescope. It was officially named after the mythological Adrasteia, foster mother of the Greek god Zeus—the equivalent of the Roman god Jupiter.

Adrastea is one of the few moons in the Solar System known to orbit its planet in less than the length of that planet's day. It orbits at the edge of Jupiter's main ring and is thought to be the main contributor of material to the rings of Jupiter. Despite observations made in the 1990s by the Galileo spacecraft, very little is known about the moon's physical characteristics other than its size and the fact that it is tidally locked to Jupiter.

Discovery and observations 

Adrastea was discovered by David C. Jewitt and G. Edward Danielson in Voyager 2 probe photographs taken on July 8, 1979, and received the designation . Although it appeared only as a dot, it was the first moon to be discovered by an interplanetary spacecraft. Soon after its discovery, two other of the inner moons of Jupiter (Thebe and Metis) were observed in the images taken a few months earlier by Voyager 1. The Galileo spacecraft was able to determine the moon's shape in 1998, but the images remain poor. In 1983, Adrastea was officially named after the Greek nymph Adrastea, the daughter of Zeus and his lover Ananke.

Although the Juno orbiter, which arrived at Jupiter in 2016, has a camera called JunoCam, it is almost entirely focused on observations of Jupiter itself. However, if all goes well, it should be able to capture some limited images of the moons Metis and Adrastea.

Physical characteristics 
Adrastea has an irregular shape and measures 20×16×14 km across. A surface area estimate would be between 840 and 1,600 (~1,200) km2. This makes it the smallest of the four inner moons. The bulk, composition and mass of Adrastea are not known, but assuming that its mean density is like that of Amalthea, around 0.86 g/cm3, its mass can be estimated at about 2 kg. Amalthea's density implies that the moon is composed of water ice with a porosity of 10–15%, and Adrastea may be similar.

No surface details of Adrastea are known, due to the low resolution of available images.

Orbit 
Adrastea is the smallest and second-closest member of the inner Jovian satellite family. It orbits Jupiter at a radius of about  (1.806 Jupiter radii) at the exterior edge of the planet's main ring. The orbit has very small eccentricity and inclination—around 0.0015 and 0.03°, respectively. Inclination is relative to the equator of Jupiter.

Due to tidal locking, Adrastea rotates synchronously with its orbital period, keeping one face always looking toward the planet. Its long axis is aligned towards Jupiter, this being the lowest energy configuration.

The orbit of Adrastea lies inside Jupiter's synchronous orbit radius (as does Metis's), and as a result, tidal forces are slowly causing its orbit to decay so that it will one day impact Jupiter. If its density is similar to Amalthea's then its orbit would actually lie within the fluid Roche limit. However, since it is not breaking up, it must still lie outside its rigid Roche limit.

Adrastea is the second-fastest-moving of Jupiter's moons, with an orbital speed of 31.378 km/s.

Relationship with Jupiter's rings 
Adrastea is the largest contributor to material in Jupiter's rings. This appears to consist primarily of material that is ejected from the surfaces of Jupiter's four small inner satellites by meteorite impacts. It is easy for the impact ejecta to be lost from these satellites into space. This is due to the satellites' low density and their surfaces lying close to the edge of their Hill spheres.

It seems that Adrastea is the most copious source of this ring material, as evidenced by the densest ring (the main ring) being located at and within Adrastea's orbit. More precisely, the orbit of Adrastea lies near the outer edge of Jupiter's main ring.  The exact extent of visible ring material depends on the phase angle of the images: in forward-scattered light Adrastea is firmly outside the main ring, but in back-scattered light (which reveals much bigger particles) there appears to also be a narrow ringlet outside Adrastea's orbit.

Notes

References

Cited sources
 
 
 
 
 
  (discovery)
  (naming the moon)

External links
 Adrastea Profile by NASA's Solar System Exploration

Moons of Jupiter
19790708
Discoveries by David C. Jewitt
Discoveries by G. Edward Danielson
Moons with a prograde orbit